John Bennett Bani (born 1 July 1941) is a former Vanuatuan politician who was the president of Vanuatu from 25 March 1999 to 24 March 2004. He is an Anglican priest from Pentecost Island, and is one of the founders of the Cultural Association which later become the Vanua'aku Pati.

See also
List of national leaders

References

1941 births
Living people
Presidents of Vanuatu
Vanuatuan Anglican priests
20th-century Anglican priests
People from Penama Province
Union of Moderate Parties politicians